Mouth Sounds is a mashup album by American musician Neil Cicierega. The album was released independently by Cicierega on April 27, 2014. Consisting of mashups pairing Top 40 hits of the 1980s and 1990s along with Smash Mouth's "All Star", Mouth Sounds received positive reviews from music critics. It received a second installment, Mouth Silence, three months later, which followed the same mashup format, a third installment, Mouth Moods, in 2017, and a fourth installment, Mouth Dreams, in 2020.

Background

Cicierega began work on the album after discovering multiple raw instrument tracks from songs featured on the music video game series Rock Band. Because Rock Band requires players to control individual instruments for each track, all artists featured in Rock Band must provide the stems of each song featured in the game. With access to these tracks, Cicierega was able to create mashups of the provided songs. The process was mostly trial and error, where he paired songs together randomly, and kept what sounded good. Cicierega tried to only pull popular songs, explaining "If you're doing a comedy album with mashups, then you definitely want to use songs that people will recognize." The purpose of the album was to make Cicierega laugh, but also to offend fans of the songs and artists he used in the album.

Mouth Sounds development dates as far back as late 2012. Later on, the song "No Credit Card" (a remix of Huey Lewis and the News' "The Power of Love") appeared on Neil Cicierega's SoundCloud account on February 6, 2013. Over the following year, rougher edits of the songs "Vivid Memories Turn to Fantasies," "The Sharpest Tool," "Modest Mouth," "Imma Let It Be," "Like Tears in Chocolate Rain," "Melt Everyone," and "Smooth Flow," would be uploaded to the same SoundCloud, with the final track, "Mullet with Butterfly Wings," dropping just over a week before Mouth Sounds itself was released. In addition, Cicierega posted a music video for "The Sharpest Tool" (titled "MOUTH") to his main YouTube channel a year earlier on February 9, 2013.

While developing the prequel to Mouth Sounds, Cicierega created a setting for both albums, concerning the existence of parallel universes. In the universe with which Mouth Sounds lies, the band Smash Mouth exists, but not in the parallel universe created for Mouth Silence (which lacks any overt Smash Mouth-related mixes). In both universes, Cicierega delineated that a "war of music" continues on, explaining the reasoning behind the mashups.

Numerous easter eggs have been found in the digital files for Mouth Sounds and Mouth Silence that each relate to "All Star". For example, when the metadata of every track on the former is viewed, the creation date of all the files is May 4, 1999 which was the release date of "All Star." On the cover of the album, Shrek can be seen on the glasses of Cicierega, referencing how "All Star" was used at the beginning of Shrek.

Reception
Mouth Sounds received mostly positive reviews from critics. Katie Rife, writing for The A.V. Club, called the mixtape "brilliant," citing its ability to toy with the listener's nostalgia held towards the songs included, and wrapped up her review by suggesting the album to those that enjoy the thought of "dropping acid at a Media Play going-out-of-business sale." Ben Simon of Music Putty also wrote of Mouth Sounds' ability to relate to the listener's childhood memories, writing, "nostalgia is the album’s unifying theme," and citing the third track, "D'oh," as an example of when it "is taken to its most equally incredible and horrific extreme." As of July 8, 2021, the mixtape has received over 1,150,000 plays on SoundCloud.

Track listing

Notes

References

External links

Neil Cicierega's website
Mouth Sounds on Internet Archive
Neil Cicierega's band, Lemon Demon

2014 mixtape albums
Mashup albums
Smash Mouth
2014 remix albums
Neil Cicierega remix albums